Equestrian competitions at the 2022 South American Games in Asuncion, Paraguay are scheduled to be held between October 2 and 11, 2022 at the Club Hípico Paraguayo

Schedule
The competition schedule is as follows:

Medal summary

Medal table

Medalists

Participation
Eight nations will participate in equestrian events of the 2022 South American Games.

References

Equestrian
South American Games
2022
2022 South American Games